Arthur Middleton Manigault (October 26, 1824 – August 17, 1886) was a brigadier general in the Confederate States Army during the American Civil War.

Early life and career
Manigault was born in Charleston, South Carolina in 1824. His parents were Joseph and Charlotte Manigault. His grandfather, Peter Manigault, was the richest person in British North America in 1770.  Joseph Manigault's great-great-grandfather was Pierre Manigault  (1664–1729), a French Huguenot who was born in La Rochelle, France and settled in Charleston. His mother was both the daughter of Charles Drayton, a South Carolina Lt. Governor, and the granddaughter of Henry Middleton, the second President of the First Continental Congress, whose grandfather, Edward Middleton, emigrated from England via Barbados. Her uncle, Arthur Middleton, was one of the signers of the Declaration of Independence.

Manigault attended the College of Charleston, although he abandoned his studies to pursue an interest in business. During the Mexican–American War, he served in the United States Army as a first lieutenant with the Palmetto Regiment. From 1847 to 1856, he was a businessman in Charleston. On April 15, 1850 he married Mary Proctor Huger, the granddaughter of Daniel Elliott Huger. They had five children together. In 1856, he inherited a rice plantation in Georgetown County, South Carolina and moved there.

Civil War
A few days before the outbreak of the Civil War, Manigault participated in the Battle of Fort Sumter. He was colonel of the 10th South Carolina Infantry, and helped construct the batteries for the defense of Winyah Bay in Georgetown County. In March 1862, he was ordered to dismantle the coastal batteries and to ship the guns to Charleston. In April 1862, he was commanded to take his troops and report to General P. G. T. Beauregard with the Army of Mississippi.

In northern Mississippi, Manigault saw action during the Siege of Corinth. Afterwards he served with the reorganized Army of Tennessee and saw action at the Battles of Stone's River and Chickamauga. He was present during the Battle of Missionary Ridge.  During the late spring and summer of 1864, he participated in the Atlanta Campaign.

On April 26, 1863, he was promoted to brigadier general. During the war, he was wounded twice: first in Georgia at the Battle of Resaca in May 1864, and then at the Second Battle of Franklin during November 1864. His second injury prevented his return to active service.

Postbellum activities
After the war, Manigault returned to manage his rice plantation in South Carolina. From 1880 to 1886, he served as the Adjutant and Inspector General of South Carolina. He died in Georgetown County, South Carolina in 1886 and is buried in the Magnolia Cemetery in Charleston.

See also

 List of American Civil War generals (Confederate)
 Stones River Confederate order of battle
 Chickamauga Confederate order of battle
 Franklin II Confederate order of battle
 List of Huguenots

Notes

References
 Eicher, David J. The Longest Night: A Military History of the Civil War. New York: Simon & Schuster, 2001. .
 Eicher, John H., and David J. Eicher, Civil War High Commands. Stanford: Stanford University Press, 2001. .
 Owen, Richard, and James Owen. Generals at Rest: The Grave Sites of the 425 Official Confederate Generals. Shippensburg, PA: White Mane Publishing Co., 1997. .
 Sifakis, Stewart. Who Was Who in the Civil War. New York: Facts On File, 1988. .
 United States War Department. The War of the Rebellion: a Compilation of the Official Records of the Union and Confederate Armies. Washington, DC: U.S. Government Printing Office, 1880–1901. .
 Warner, Ezra J. Generals in Gray: Lives of the Confederate Commanders. Baton Rouge: Louisiana State University Press, 1959. .
 Online biography of Hill
 Wakelyn Jon L. Biographical Dictionary of the Confederacy. Westport, CT: Greenwood Press, 1977. .

External links

 

1824 births
1886 deaths
Military personnel from Charleston, South Carolina
Confederate States Army brigadier generals
United States Army officers
Middleton family
American military personnel of the Mexican–American War
People of South Carolina in the American Civil War
American people of English descent
American people of Barbadian descent
American people of French descent